The 2020 Albanian Cup Final was a football match that was played on 2 August 2020 to decide the winner of the 2019–20 Albanian Cup, the 68th edition of Albania's primary football cup. The match was played between Teuta and Tirana at Arena Kombëtare in Tirana.
Teuta won the match 2−0, their fourth time winning the Albanian Cup.

Match

Details

Notes

References

Cup Final
2020
Albanian Cup
Sports competitions in Tirana
Albanian Cup Final, 2020
Albanian Cup Final, 2020